The Florida Panthers are an American professional ice hockey team based in the Miami metropolitan area. They play in the Atlantic Division of the Eastern Conference in the National Hockey League (NHL). The team joined the NHL in 1993 as an expansion team, and won their first Eastern Conference championship in 1996. The Panthers have played their home games at the BB&T Center since 1998. The Panthers are owned by Sunrise Sports and Entertainment, and Bill Zito is their general manager.

There have been 16 head coaches for the Panthers franchise. The team's first head coach was Roger Neilson, who coached for two complete seasons from 1993 to 1995. Jacques Martin is the franchise's all-time leader for the most regular-season game wins (110), the most regular-season points (256), and is tied with Peter DeBoer for the most regular-season games coached (246); Doug MacLean is the franchise's all-time leader for the most playoff games coached (27), and the most playoff-game wins (13). Murray's brother, Terry Murray, has also coached the Panthers, right after his brother Bryan. MacLean is the only coach to have won the Prince of Wales Trophy with the Panthers; they lost the 1996 Stanley Cup Finals to the Colorado Avalanche. Neilson is the only Panthers coach to have been elected into the Hockey Hall of Fame; he was inducted as a builder. Duane Sutter and Kevin Dineen  spent their entire NHL head coaching careers with the Panthers. DeBoer was the head coach of the Panthers from 2008–2011. The Panther's current head coach is Paul Maurice.


Key

Coaches
Note: Statistics are correct through the end of the 2018–19 season.

Notes
  A running total of the number of coaches of the Panthers. Thus, any coach who has two or more separate terms as head coach is only counted once.
  Before the 2005–06 season, the NHL instituted a penalty shootout for regular season games that remained tied after a five-minute overtime period, which prevented ties.
  In hockey, the winning percentage is calculated by dividing points by maximum possible points.
  Each year is linked to an article about that particular NHL season.

References

General

Specific

Florida Panthers coaches
Florida Panthers head coaches
Head coaches